Coram Deo is a Latin phrase translated "in the presence of God" from Christian theology which summarizes the idea of Christians living in the presence of, under the authority of, and to the honor and glory of God. The phrase may refer to:

Coram Deo Academy, an American private Christian school in Dallas, Texas
Coram Deo Classical Academy, an American private Christian School in Bartlesville, Oklahoma
Coram Deo Academy for Pastoral Narrative Therapy, an NGO which is an Oasis of Hope in Southern Africa

See also
 Coram Deo II, a multi-artist album; see 25th GMA Dove Awards